Rudy Omankowski Jr. is a France-based highwire walker born in 1937 in Czechoslovakia into a long line of circus and highwire performers.

Biography
Among his most notable performances is his 1.25 km skywalk between two mountain tops in Gérardmer, les Vosges, France.  It is the longest skywalk known to have been achieved. Omankowski also traversed the Cheddar Gorge, Cheddar in Somerset England in 1959 and again in 1961. He did not use a net.
                                                                                                                 
Omankowski is now a highwire teacher at the Centre Nationale des Arts du Cirque in Châlons-en-Champagne, France, and has mentored many prominent highwire and circus artists, including Didier Pasquette, Jade Kindar-Martin and Molly Saudek.

References

Tightrope walkers
Living people
Year of birth missing (living people)